Jarosław Roman Szczepankiewicz (born 1962) is a Polish diplomat. 

He was an ambassador to Ethiopia from 2008 to 2012, and since 2018 has been currently serving as chargé d'affaires to the Philippines .

Life 
Szczepankiewicz holds an Master of Arts degree in Oriental philosophy from the Catholic University of Lublin. 

He also studied at the Institut national des langues et civilisations orientales in Paris, the National School of Public Administration in Warsaw, the Netherlands Institute of International Relations Clingendael in The Hague, and the University of Paris.

In 1998, Szczepankiewicz joined Poland's Ministry of Foreign Affairs. He has been working as a Head of Task Force Group, Department of European Integration. 

Between 2001 and 2007 he was Head of Section at the Department of Promotion. 

From 2008 to 2012 he held the post of the ambassador extraordinary and plenipotentiary of the Republic of Poland to the Federal Democratic Republic of Ethiopia, accredited also to the Republic of Djibouti and Permanent Representative of Poland to the African Union. 

Afterwards, from 2012 to 2017, he was Minister-Counsellor at the Department of Africa and the Middle East. For the next year he was at the Consular Department. 

Since 2018 he is representing Poland to the Philippines as chargé d'affaires.

Beside Polish, he speaks English and French.

References 

1962 births
Ambassadors of Poland to Ethiopia
Ambassadors of Poland to the Philippines
Living people
John Paul II Catholic University of Lublin alumni